Filippo "Phil" Di Bennardo (born April 20, 1997) is a Canadian professional soccer player who plays as a goalkeeper.

Career

Club 
Di Bennardo started his career with Woodbridge SC at the age of four. He later joined the Toronto FC Academy. He joined affiliate club Toronto FC II on loan during the 2015 USL season, where he made two appearances. He made his professional debut on September 5, 2015 in a 3-2 victory over FC Montreal, before also featuring in a 3-2 defeat to Rochester Rhinos on September 25.

International 
Di Bennardo's first international involvement came at the age of 15, when he was selected by Michael Findlay for the Mexico Cup of Nations Under-15 squad in 2012. His next opportunity came in 2015, when Rob Gale included him in an Under-20 development camp in Mexico. However, the goalkeeper is yet to make an international appearance.

References 

1997 births
Living people
Canadian soccer players
Toronto FC II players
Association football goalkeepers
Soccer players from Toronto
League1 Ontario players
USL Championship players